The 1925–26 season was the 27th season for FC Barcelona.

Results

External links

webdelcule.com
webdelcule.com

References

FC Barcelona seasons
Barcelona